Keith Crofford (born April 14, 1956) is the former executive vice president of production for Adult Swim, the adult-oriented division of Cartoon Network, and general manager of Williams Street. He was executive producer for several Williams Street in-house productions such as Space Ghost Coast to Coast, Aqua Teen Hunger Force, The Brak Show and Squidbillies. He also served as the executive producer for Williams Street out-of-house productions such as Sealab 2021, Robot Chicken, Tom Goes to the Mayor, Minoriteam and Moral Orel. Crofford was also the executive in charge of production for Adult Swim's The Venture Bros.

Crofford was born in Tuscaloosa, Alabama, and attended Florida State University from 1974 to 1978.

In 1996, Crofford voiced MOE 2000, an unfeeling computer director, in an episode, "$20.01", of Space Ghost Coast to Coast on Cartoon Network. He also voiced himself in Robot Chicken four times from 2005 to 2008 on Adult Swim.

In December 2020, Crofford retired from the company.

References

External links 

 

1956 births
Living people
People from Tuscaloosa, Alabama
Florida State University alumni
American male voice actors
American television writers
American television executives
Cartoon Network executives
American male television writers
Primetime Emmy Award winners
Screenwriters from Alabama
Williams Street
Television producers from Alabama